Singai Pararasasegaram (died 1519), was one of the most well known kings of the later Aryacakravarti kings of the Jaffna kingdom. He was the father of Cankili I.

Biography
Singai Pararajaseakaram was the first-born son of Kanakasooriya Singaiariyan who lost and then regained the Jaffna kingdom from the rival Kotte kingdom. Singai Pararajasekaram is also the first in line not to use the title Singaiariyan as part of the regnal name. After him all kings had the shorter version Singai as part of the regnal name. After regaining the kingdom, kings such as Singai Pararajasekaram concentrated in developing the core area of the kingdom rather than territorial expansion. 
  
Singai Pararajasekarm had two wives. One Rasaletchumi Ammal, Valliammai and a concubine named Mangathammal. He had eight children through the two wives and one concubine.

Rule
He was known for directing his energies towards consolidating the Kingdom's economic potential by maximising revenue from pearls and elephant exports and land revenue.   He is also recognized for his aggressive and violent nature. The kingdom became less feudal than most of other Sri Lanka kingdoms of the same period. Important local Tamil literature was produced and Hindu temples were built during this period including an academy for language advancement.

Notes

References

1519 deaths
Kings of Jaffna
Sri Lankan Hindus
Sri Lankan Tamil royalty
Year of birth unknown
15th-century monarchs in Asia
16th-century monarchs in Asia